Shaho is a mountain of the central Zagros Mountains range. It is located between cities of Kamyaran, Sarvabad, Marivan, Nowdeshah, Nowsud, Paveh, Javanrud, Ravansar in the district of Kurdistan and Kermanshah provinces, western Iran. The highest peak of this mountain is called Havi Khani, located at the height of 3400 meters. Some of the other highest peaks are Zavoli 3205 meters, Pir Kheder 3090 meters, Nour 3110 meters highest from the sea level. The Shaho mountain is close to the Sirvan River.

This area contains notable villages such as  Hajij, Shamshir, Palangan and Hawraman Takht.

'Shaho' is a rather popular male name in the Kurdish speaking cities of Iran.

Bears, foxes, jackals, wolves, pigs, rabbits, antelope and Partridges are usual animals of this mount.

References

External links

Zagros Mountains
Three-thousanders
Mountains of Kermanshah Province
Geography of Iranian Kurdistan
Mountains of Iran